Hydrocortisone hemisuccinate, also known as hydrocortisone hydrogen succinate or simply hydrocortisone succinate and sold under the brand name Solu-Cortel among many others, is a synthetic glucocorticoid corticosteroid and a corticosteroid ester which is used for antiinflammatory and antiallergic indications.

See also
 List of corticosteroid esters

References

Corticosteroid esters
Glucocorticoids
Mineralocorticoids
Succinate esters